Prožinska Vas is a settlement in the Municipality of Štore in eastern Slovenia. It lies on both banks of the Voglajna River and extends southwards into the hills southeast of Štore. The area is part of the traditional region of Styria. It is now included with the rest of the municipality in the Savinja Statistical Region.

References

External links
Prožinska Vas on Geopedia

Populated places in the Municipality of Štore